Ramona Cecilia Datuin Muñoz (born 12 January 1989), professionally known as Arci Muñoz, is a Filipino actress, model, singer and dancer. She is the vocalist of the Filipino rock band Philia and currently serving in the Philippine Air Force as a Sergeant.

Career
Muñoz entered the entertainment industry through the third season of the reality talent show, StarStruck in 2005. After StarStruck, she appeared in several television shows on GMA and TV5, and in 2008, she represented the Philippines in the third annual Asia Super Model Contest.

Before gaining the leading lady status, Arci Munoz played some evil villain and cunning roles in Princess Charming (2007), Pati Ba Pintig ng Puso (2007), Zaido: Pulis Pangkalawakan (2007), and Maging Akin Ka Lamang (2008).

Later in 2009, Arci played the main antagonist role of Donna Benitez in Ngayon at Kailanman. Donna is the obsessive girlfriend of Edwin (played by JC de Vera) who will do everything for him even committing murder, kidnapping, and vile schemes.

In 2010, she appeared as the Melanie Tecson, a recurring antagonist in Langit sa Piling Mo.

In 2011, she appeared again as the main antagonist of My Driver Sweet Lover as the evil scheming Monique and pulls everything to steal Rocky (played by JC de Vera) from Gabrielle.

In 2012, she started as felina in the hit show Felina: Prinsesa ng mga Pusa. This was her first lead role.

Since then, she became a leading actress in TV5 and ABS-CBN. On 27 April 2013, Muñoz's band Philia played at Pulp Summer Slam 13:"Til Death Do Us Part".

Muñoz transferred to ABS-CBN in September 2014 and is cast as one of the main stars of Pasion de Amor.

On 17 July 2020, it was announced that Muñoz is joining the series on the upcoming Kapamilya Channel's Walang Hanggang Paalam, after Julia Montes and Nadine Lustre are backed out.

Meanwhile, on 30 September 2021, Muñoz announced she is running for councilor in Cainta, Rizal under the political party Lakas-Christian Muslim Democrats’ (Lakas-CMD).

On 17 December 2021, Muñoz appeared on the music video of TOMORO and Sean Kingston.

Filmography

Television

Movies

References

External links
 
 Rhian Ramos talks about supermodel competition in China

Living people
Filipino child actresses
Filipino film actresses
Filipino television actresses
Star Magic
Filipino people of Spanish descent
People from Rizal
People from Quezon City
Tagalog people
Actresses from Metro Manila
StarStruck (Philippine TV series) participants
Viva Artists Agency
ABS-CBN personalities
GMA Network personalities
Philippine Air Force personnel
University of the Philippines alumni
21st-century Filipino women singers
1989 births